is a 12-episode Japanese anime  television series animated by TNK.

Plot
The story revolves around Tsukishima Yui and five other girls who were summoned into the Edo period by the power of mysterious stones. Each one of them became celestial nymphs and obtained different powers, that were provided by the stones. The power Tsukishima received was "words". She would fight against evils by her "words" that gave hope to all the people.

Characters

Staff
 Director: Nobuhiro Takamoto
 Music: Jun Ichikawa
 Original creator: Utawaka Katsura
 Character Design: Miwa Oshima
 Art director: Takashi Miyano
 Director of Photography: Naoto Sawa
 Color design: Yoshinori Ueki
 Editing: Takashi Sakurai
 Producers: Futoshi Nakabayashi, Hiroki Mihara, Isao Hidaka, Takayuki Ogura
 Publicity: Shuuji Kojima
 Sound director: Hajime Takakuwa
 Collaboration: Rakugo Tennyo Association

Theme songs
Opening songs
 "Sakura Saku" by Little Non
Ending songs
 "Hana Fubuki" by Hiromi Kashima

Music Producers
 Shinsuke Motono
 Yuuki Horio

Cast
 Saori Goto as Yui Tsukishima
 Ai Shimizu as Suzu Koishikawa
 Akira Ishida as Kikyo Kotsukahara
 Junko Noda as Akira Naito
 Kenyuu Horiuchi as Sanyuutei enchou
 Koyuuza Sanyuutei as Sanyuutei
 Masaki Terasoma as Hirakagenai
 Megumi Kojima as Ponta
 Michie Tomizawa as Ogin
 Mitsuaki Madono as Ukyo Kotsukahara
 Miyuki Sawashiro as Tae Yanaka
 Sachiko Kojima as Miyabi Asukayama
 Utamaru Katsura as Utamaru Katsura
 Yu Kobayashi as Ryo Sengoku
 Yasuyuki Kase as Toshizou Hijikata

External links
 Official site 
 
 

2006 Japanese television series debuts
2006 Japanese television series endings
Anime with original screenplays
Comedy anime and manga
Magical girl anime and manga
TNK (company)